The Admiralty Fire Control Table (A.F.C.T.) was an electromechanical analogue computer fire-control system that calculated the correct elevation and deflection of the main armament of a Royal Navy cruiser or battleship, so that the shells fired would strike a surface target. Battleships of the King George V class received a Mk IX table, while  received the final variant, the Mk X. The AFCT was the successor to the Dreyer tables, developed by Captain (later Admiral) Frederic Charles Dreyer, and the Argo Clock, developed by Arthur Pollen, and received developmental input from both men.

The Admiralty Fire Control Clock (AFCC) was a simplified version of the AFCT and was used for the local control of main armament and primary  control of secondary armament of battleships and cruisers, and the main armament of destroyers and other small vessels. Some smaller cruisers also used the AFCC for main armament control. The chief difference between the AFCT and the AFCC was the provision of a paper plotter in the former, which could plot both own ship and target ship movement and record the mean point of impact of the salvoes fired.

The AFCT and AFCC were used for gunnery control against surface targets. The High Angle Control System and Fuze Keeping Clock were used for gunnery control against aircraft.

See also 

 Director (military)

Notes

Further reading

External links
 The RN Pocket Gunnery Book 
 Illustration of the AFCT 
 B.R. 901/43, Handbook of The Admiralty Fire Control Clock Mark I and I*, 1943 
 Illustration of the AFCC 
 HMS Prince of Wales's Gunnery Aspects Report with discussion of, and plotter output from, her AFCT Mk IX 
 BRITISH MECHANICAL GUNNERY COMPUTERS OF WORLD WAR II 

Artillery operation
Military computers
Fire-control computers of World War II
Military equipment introduced in the 1920s